The 2020 cycling season began in Australia at the Tour Down Under for Team Ineos in January. This is the tenth season for the team and second with the current sponsor. Effective from August 2020 the team became known as Ineos Grenadiers.

2020 roster

 

Riders who joined the team for the 2020 season

Riders who left the team during or after the 2019 season

Season victories

National, Continental and World champions

Footnotes

References

External links
 

2020 in British sport
2020 road cycling season by team
Ineos Grenadiers